Gamalon is a progressive/jazz-rock fusion band from Buffalo, NY founded by Ted Reinhardt, George Puleo, and Bruce Brucato.  Albums were recorded from the late 1980s to late 1990s, with the band performing with various line-ups until 2012.

Biography 
In 1982, Brucato and Reinhardt joined forces with Puleo and Greg Piontek and Rick McGirr to create Gamelon. In the mid-1980s, the classic line up of Puleo, Brucato, Ted Reinhardt, and brother Tom Reinhardt was formed, re-spelling their name to the more phonetically pleasing Gamalon. This lineup released their self-titled debut album Gamalon in 1987. Following that release the lineup was augmented by violinist Geoff Perry. They went on to record Aerial View and High Contrast. In 1995, Puleo left the band and was replaced by Tony Scozzaro. This lineup recorded one album, Held to the Light. After Scozzaro left, guitar duties were handled by Nori Bucci and Dave Schmeidler. After bassist Tom Reinhardt left the band, he was replaced at various times by Jim Wynne and Jack Kulp, before returning to the lineup in the 2000s.

The band played a reunion show in 2012 in New York with the classic 4-piece lineup.

Bruce Brucato died on January 15, 2014.

On March 4, 2015, founding and core member Ted Reinhardt died in a plane crash. Reinhardt has also played with Rodan, Taxi, Willie and the Reinhardts, Ron Locurto and the Reinhardts, the Dave Constantino Band, Junction West, Left Hand of Darkness, and Spyro Gyra. In 1973, playing with a Buffalo band called Rush, Ted opened for Genesis in Buffalo, NY.

Three Gamalon members brothers Ted and Tom Reinhardt, and Bruce Brucato played in a band called Rodan (Buffalo, N.Y) in the 1970s, along with keyboardist Rick McGirr and bassist Bill Ludwig.

Discography 
 Gamalon (1987)
 Project: Activation Earth (1989)
 Aerial View (1990)
 High Contrast (1991)
 Held to the Light (1996)
 Live at The Tralf (1998)

Personnel 
 Ted Reinhardt - drums, percussion, chapman stick (1982–2015), bass (1984-1986, 2006–2015)
 Bruce Brucato - guitars (1982-2006)
 George Puleo - guitars (1982-1996)
 Greg Piontek - bass (1982-1984)
 Tom Reinhardt - bass (1984-1996, 2001-2006)
 Tom Schuman - keyboards (1982-1983)
 Rick McGirr - keyboards (1983-1985)
 Jim Wynne - bass, keyboards (1996-2001, 2006–2015)
 Tony Scozzaro - guitars (1996-2004)
 Geoffrey Perry - violin, piccolo bass, guitar (1989-1996)
 Jack Kulp - bass (2001-2004)
 Nori Bucci - guitars (2004-2006)
 Bob Accurso - percussion, malletKAT (2006–2015)
 Dave Schmeidler - guitars (2006-2012)

References

progarchives.com
freedb.org
musicbrainz.org
last.fm
buffalo.com
fandalism.com
guitar9.com
legacy.com
progressiveears.org
truthinshredding.com

External links 
Gamalon MySpace Page
Progress Archives
Nori Bucci's Website
Gamalon Home Page (Updated: 07/13/97)

American jazz ensembles from New York (state)